Robin Preiss Glasser (born 1956) is an American illustrator, best known for her work on the Fancy Nancy series of children's picture books (from 2005), written by Jane O'Connor.

Biography
Glasser was raised in a Jewish family in Poughkeepsie, New York, one of four sisters including the children's writer Jacqueline Preiss Weitzman. She has had two successful careers, the first as a ballet dancer and the second as an illustrator. She began her career as a soloist with the Pennsylvania Ballet, until injury forced her to leave. She returned to school at age 30 and earned her Bachelor of Fine Arts from Parsons The New School for Design. After graduation, it took five years for her big break, when she was asked to illustrate Alexander, Who's Not (Do You Hear Me? I Mean It!) Going to Move by Judith Viorst, published by Atheneum Books in 1995. It was a sequel to the extraordinarily successful Alexander and the Terrible, Horrible, No Good, Very Bad Day (Atheneum, 1972) and Glasser worked "in the style of Ray Cruz," the original illustrator. She and her sister, Jacqueline Weitzman, collaborated on You Can't Take a Balloon Into the Metropolitan Museum, which featured an adventure through the streets of New York City and was named an ALA Notable Book for 1998. (You Can't Take a Balloon is Glasser's second-published title in the Library of Congress catalog.) Since then she has illustrated picture books with writers including radio star Garrison Keillor, poet Elizabeth Garton Scanlon, and Sarah Ferguson, Duchess of York.

She also collaborated on three books with Lynne Cheney, the wife of the then Vice President, whom she first met in 2001. Her illustrations for  America, A Patriotic Primer were described as "the greatest strength of this ambitious project, with endearing children of all colors, kinds, and cultures, and dozens of historical figures and sites rendered in carefully researched detail."

In 2005 Glasser was paired with the writer Jane O’Connor to illustrate the  Fancy Nancy  books, where her "action-filled pen-and-ink drawings put Nancy in wild tutus, ruby slippers, fairy wings and fuzzy slippers". Books in the series, which now number more than 100 titles, have spent over 330 weeks on the New York Times Best Sellers list, and have sold more than 50 million volumes. The Children's Book Council named her 2013 Illustrator of the Year for Fancy Nancy and the Mermaid Ballet after more than 1 million young people cast their votes in the 6th annual Children's Choice Book Awards. Disney Junior turned Glasser's most popular character into an animated television heroine, with the Disney Fancy Nancy (TV series) debuting on July 13, 2018, and the animation company greenlighting a second season even before the show premiered. Disney Junior ordered a third season of the Emmy Award-nominated series ahead of its October 4, 2019, Season Two premiere.

Glasser continues to collaborate with the international best-selling author Ann Patchett. They met while Glasser was on a book tour for Fancy Nancy at Patchett's Nashville book store Parnassus Books. Lambslide, Patchett's first book for children, was published on May 7, 2019. The second book by the duo, Escape Goat, came out in Fall 2020, and additional books together are planned.

Glasser returned to her ballet roots to illustrate Grand Jeté and Me, with New York City Ballet legend Allegra Kent. In 2020, American Ballet Theatre and Penguin Random House began a collaborative publishing program and they asked Glasser to write and illustrate a story based on what she felt like as a child, so crazy about dancing that it was all she wanted to do. GLORIA'S PROMISE: A Ballet Dancer's First Step was written with her sister Jacqueline Preiss Weitzman and published in March 2023. While it is for the serious dance student, it is not just a ballet story. The book is about every kid who is passionate about something they love to do and is a reminder that even if you trip up, you shouldn't give up.

In 2015 Glasser was named one of 100 Most Influential people in Orange County, California,. She lives in San Juan Capistrano with her husband, attorney Robert Berman.   Glasser has a son and a daughter. She was diagnosed with breast cancer in 2012, but has since recovered.

References

External links 

 
  – with cover image

Living people
1956 births
American women illustrators
American children's book illustrators
People from San Juan Capistrano, California
People from Poughkeepsie, New York
Parsons School of Design alumni
Artists from California
Artists from New York (state)
21st-century American women